The 8th Line Battalion of the King's German Legion was a Hanoverian unit in British service during the Napoleonic Wars.

Chronology
The unit was raised during the year 1806 as the last out of eight line battalions that the Legion levied in total. It was only half completed when the British Expeditionary force withdrew from Hanover early 1806 and subsequently filled up as recruits became available.

The battalion was initially brigaded with the 7th Line Battalion of the Legion. It served from 1805 until 1816 in Ireland, Walcheren, Copenhagen, Sicily, Peninsula and Belgium. It took part in the Northern Italian campaign, resulting in the capture of Genoa in April 1814.

On 18 June 1815, during the Battle of Waterloo, the battalion was nearly wiped out during the fighting in the centre of Wellington's battle line and lost a flag.

Uniforms and equipment
Uniform and Equipment of the Legion's Line battalions was of standard British pattern of the time. In accord it was repeatedly revised during the years from 1803 until 1815. In general it was composed of:
Red uniform with dark blue cuffs and collar, laced with regimental lace 
Grey legwear 
White leather equipment with black leather pouch.
Brown Bess musket 
Stovepipe shako, later Belgic shako
The principal distinction from British units was that the backpack was of dark blue colour rather than black.

References

Bibliography
 Beamish, N. Ludlow. History of the King's German Legion vol 1,1832 reprint Naval and Military Press, 1997 
 Beamish, N. Ludlow. History of the King's German Legion vol 2,1832 reprint Naval and Military Press, 1997 
 Chappell, Mike. The King's German Legion (1) 1803–1812.  Botley, Oxford: Osprey Publishing, 2000. .
 Chappell, Mike. The King's German Legion (2) 1812–1815.  Botley, Oxford: Osprey Publishing, 2000. .

King's German Legion, 8th Line Battalion
King's German Legion
Military units and formations established in 1803
Military units and formations disestablished in 1816